The American Le Mans Series (ALMS) features several championships awarded by the International Motor Sports Association (IMSA) to the most successful competitors within each of the racing categories used by the series each season.  Individual championships are awarded for being the top point scoring drivers and teams as well as chassis, engine, and tire manufacturers.  Other unique championships include the IMSA Cup, Founder's Cup, Michelin Green X Challenge, and the ALMS Challenge.  The Drivers', Teams', Chassis Manufacturers', and Automobile Manufacturers' Championships have been awarded since the formation of the series in 1999, while the Tire and Engine Manufacturers' Championships were introduced in the 2000 season.

Drivers' Championship
From the start of the American Le Mans Series until the end of the 2002 season, individual drivers were allowed to earn up to three bonus points if they met certain criteria; any driver which led a lap of the race within their category earned one point, whichever driver led the most laps of the race earned one point, and whichever driver set the fastest lap of the race earned one point.  From 2003 onward the bonus system was eradicated and drivers earned the same points as their co-drivers.

 Eric Lux drove for a different team from teammates Ricardo González and Gunnar Jeannette.  The three finished the season on equal points, and a tie breaker was not able to be utilized, therefore the three drivers all shared the championship.

Teams' Championship

Manufacturer championships
The Chassis Manufacturers' and Automobile Manufacturers' Championships are combined into a single listing.  The grand tourer categories do not have a separate Engine Manufacturers' Championship.

Chassis and Automobile Manufacturers' Championships

Engine Manufacturers' Championship

Tire Manufacturers' Championship

Other championships

IMSA Cup
The IMSA Cup was a championship for teams which were not designated as being run by an automobile manufacturer.  The 2002 championship was awarded to a full team, while from 2003 onward the championship points were awarded to each individual entry.  For the 2011 season, due to a lack of manufacturer supported teams in the ALMS, the IMSA Cup was not awarded.

Founders Cup
The Founders Cup is an annual award to recognize the accomplishments of a gentleman driver.  A single championship is awarded covering all categories.

Michelin Green X Challenge
The Michelin Green X Challenge is a championship based on energy efficiency over the course of a season.  The Green X Challenge debuted at the end of 2008, but the first championship was not awarded until the 2009 season.  Two championships are awarded, one for both LMP classes and one for both GT classes.

Manufacturers Championship

Teams Championship

References
 All championship results are taken from IMSARacing.net

External links
 American Le Mans Series
 International Motor Sports Association

champions
Le Mans
American Le Mans Series